Ján Stanislav (12 December 1904, Liptovský Ján, Austria-Hungary – 29 July 1977, Liptovský Mikuláš, Czechoslovakia) was a Slovak linguist and specialist in Slavic studies.

Life
He was born in Liptovský Ján in December 1904. Stanislav studied Slavic studies and Romance studies at the Comenius University in Bratislava, but also at the universities in Paris, Kraków and Ljubljana. He graduated from Faculty of Philosophy of Comenius University in Bratislava in 1928. Then he worked as an assistant and a docent at the Slavic Seminar of the university. In 1936, he became a professor of comparative Slavic linguistics and Old Church Slavonic. He dealt with linguistic and cultural conditions in the Great Moravia, but also with Slovak historical grammar, the earliest history of Slovak language and Slovaks. The name of Jan Stanislav Institute of Slavistics of Slovak Academy of Sciences pays honours to his work.

Selected works
 1932 Liptovské nárečia [The Dialects of Liptov].
 1935 Pôvod východoslovenských nárečí [The Origin of Eastern Slovak Dialects]
 1933 Československá mluvnica A Czechoslovak Grammar
 1948 Slovenský juh v stredoveku [The Slovak South in the Middle Ages] (2 volumes)
 1955–1962 Slovenská historická gramatika [A Historic Slovak Grammar]
 1956–1973 Dejiny slovenského jazyka [A History of the Slovak Language] (5 volumes)
 1978, 1987 Starosloviensky jazyk I. – II. [Old Church Slavonic I. – II.]

Awards
 2005 Order of Ľudovít Štúr (in memoriam)

References 

1904 births
1977 deaths
Academic staff of Comenius University
Linguists from Slovakia
20th-century linguists
Order of Ľudovít Štúr